The  is a title defended in the joshi puroresu (Japanese women's professional wrestling) promotion Gatoh Move Pro Wrestling. There have been a total of four recognized reigns and two interim reigns shared between five different wrestlers. The current champion is Hagane Shinno who in his first reign.

History
This triple crown title was then brought to Gatoh Move to serve as its main singles title.

In 2017, IWA Japan finally folded after ceasing their professional wrestling activities three years earlier. The IWA belts were then returned and Sakura announced the creation of the Super Asia Championship, a new title with a new lineage, as well as an eight-women single-elimination tournament that would crown the first champion. On September 22, at Gatoh Move's 5th Anniversary Show, Riho defeated  in the tournament final to become the inaugural champion.

On June 4, 2019, Riho relinquished the title after her eighth defense against Mei Suruga.

On the March 22, 2021 episode of ChocoPro, Emi Sakura announced a singles match between Minoru Fujita and Baliyan Akki for the vacant Super Asia Championship which would take place on Day 2 of the 100th episode of ChocoPro on March 28. Fujita defeated Akki to win the title. On the November 6 episode of ChocoPro, a four-way match was held to crown an interim champion while Fujita was recovering from COVID-19 complications. The match saw Choun Shiryu win against Baliyan Akki, Yuna Mizumori and Masahiro Takanashi. Choun successfully defended the title three times before losing it to Akki on the January 29, 2022 episode of ChocoPro. Akki then unified the titles  when he faced and defeated Fujita on Day 2 of the 200th ChocoPro episode on February 13.

Inaugural tournament

Reigns

Combined reigns

Notes

References

External links
Gatoh Move's official site in Japanese

Continental professional wrestling championships
Women's professional wrestling championships